Sergei Viktorovich Savochkin (born 8 February 1976) is a Russian professional football manager and a former player who manages FC Saransk.

Club career
He made his debut in the Russian Premier League in 2004 for FC Amkar Perm.

References

1976 births
Living people
People from Saransk
Russian footballers
Association football defenders
FC Amkar Perm players
Russian Premier League players
FC Mordovia Saransk players
Russian football managers
FC Nosta Novotroitsk players
Sportspeople from Mordovia